Doordarshan (abbreviated as DD; Hindi:) is an Indian public service broadcaster founded by the Government of India, owned by the Ministry of Information and Broadcasting and one of Prasar Bharati's two divisions. As one of India's largest broadcasting organisations in studio and transmitter infrastructure, it was established on 15 September 1959. Doordarshan, which also broadcasts on digital terrestrial transmitters, provides television, radio, online and mobile service throughout metropolitan and regional India and overseas.

History

Beginnings 

The channel began modestly as an experimental broadcaster in Delhi on 15 September 1959, with a small transmitter and a makeshift studio. Regular daily transmission started in 1965 as part of All India Radio, with a five-minute news bulletin read by Pratima Puri. Salma Sultan joined Doordarshan in 1967, and became a news anchor.

Krishi Darshan debuted on Doordarshan on 26 January 1967, and is Indian television's longest running program.

Television service was extended to Bombay (now Mumbai) and Amritsar in 1972. Until 1975 only seven Indian cities had television service, and Doordarshan was the country's sole television provider.

Television service was separated from radio on 1 April 1976. The All India Radio and Doordarshan were placed under the management of separate directors-general in New Delhi. In 1982, Doordarshan became a national broadcaster.

Nationwide transmission 

National telecasts (DD National) was introduced in 1982. Colour television began in India with the live telecast of the Independence Day speech by Prime Minister Indira Gandhi on 15 August of that year, followed by the colour telecast of the 1982 Asian Games in Delhi. Two years later, Doordarshan as a TV network finally took shape: the then sole TV channel was split into the nationally aired DD-1 and city channel DD-2, later rebranded in 1993 as DD National and DD Metro.

Live telecasts of the opening and closing ceremonies of the 2012 Summer Olympics were broadcast on its national channel, and DD Sports provided round-the-clock coverage.

On 17 November 2014, Doordarshan director-general Vijayalaxmi Chhabra introduced a pink-and-purple colour scheme and a new slogan: Desh Ka Apna Channel ("The country's own channel"). Doordarshan transmitted over a network of nearly 1,400 terrestrial transmitters in 2017, with 46 studios producing TV programmes. After the introduction of private channels Doordarshan is struggling to keep its position in the television space. Currently Doordarshan is trying to improve its studios and programmes while its primary aim is to serve the country.

Channels 

Doordarshan operates 46 studios and 21 television channels: two all-India channels (DD National and DD News), 17 regional satellite channels, 11 state networks, an international channel (DD India), a sports channel (DD Sports), DD Bharati, DD Retro, DD Urdu and an agricultural channel, DD Kisan. On DD National (formerly DD-1), regional and local programs are carried on a time-sharing basis for terrestrial broadcasting only. DD News, launched on 3 November 2003 replacing DD Metro (formerly known as the DD-2 entertainment channel), provides 24-hour news. These channels are relayed by all terrestrial transmitters in India. The regional-language satellite channels have two components: a regional service for a particular state (relayed by all terrestrial transmitters in the state), and additional programs in the regional language available through cable operators and DTH operators. DD Sports broadcasts sporting events of national and international importance. It is the only sports channel which telecasts rural sports such as kho-kho and kabbadi.

A new regional channel, DD Arunprabha (a 24/7 satellite television channel focusing on the North Eastern region) was scheduled to begin on 15 February 2018; however, its launch was placed on hold. DD Arunprabha was launched on 9 February 2019.

On 9 March 2019, Prasar Bharati brought 11 more State DD Channels on the Satellite footprint of India through DD Free Dish. This includes five channels for Northeastern states. This will go a long way in strengthening regional cultures and fulfilling people's aspirations. These are – DD Bangla, DD Chhattisgarh, DD Goa, DD Haryana, DD Himachal Pradesh, DD Jharkhand, DD Manipur, DD Meghalaya, DD Mizoram, DD Nagaland, DD Tripura and DD Uttarakhand. DD Bangla launched on 9 August 1975, the network's programming consists of soap operas, infotainment series, news and current affairs, social programs and films in Bengali language.

On 13 April 2020, DD Retro was launched by Prasar Bharati which showed old classic Hindi serials of Doordarshan.

Channel list

International channels

National channels

Regional channels

State Network

UT Network

Former Channels

International broadcasting 
The DD India satellite channel has been broadcast in 146 countries. In United Kingdom, it was available through the Eurobird satellite on the Sky system's channel 833; its logo was Rayat TV. Transmission via Sky Digital ended in June 2008, and via DirecTV in the United States the following month.

Record viewership during pandemic 
Ramayan on DD National created a world record by becoming highest viewed entertainment programme globally. The 9 PM show on 16 April 2020 was watched by a mammoth 7.7 crore (77 million) viewers. The show managed to reach more than 28.5 crore (285 million) viewers through the length of the broadcast. As a broadcasting response to nation-wide lockdown, apart from Ramayan, many other nostalgia shows were broadcast on DD network. These included Mahabharat, Chanakya, Shri Krishna, Byomkesh Bakshi and Shaktimaan. 
In light of increasing public demand for such retro content, Prasar Bharati launched ‘DD Retro’ as a full-time channel dedicated for the same. The channel started garnering viewership of almost 5 crore (50 million) within five weeks of its launch. 
Delivering on its mandate of public messaging, DD network, through COVID-focused awareness messages and shows, reached more than 40 crore (400 million) viewers during first wave of the pandemic in 2020.

Criticisms 
Prasar Bharati is Doordarshan's parent body, and its board members are appointed by the Government of India through the Information and Broadcasting Ministry.
Doordarshan has been used, especially during the Emergency, to disseminate government propaganda. During Operation Blue Star in 1984, only government sources were used to report the story. Doordarshan was complicit in the production of a video claiming acts of violence which, when investigated by independent journalists, were found to be false.

In 2004, it censored a controversial documentary on Jayaprakash Narayan, an opposition leader during the Emergency. 

In 2014, When Doordarshan broadcast a 70-minute Vijayadashami speech by Rashtriya Swayamsevak Sangh (RSS) leader Mohan Bhagwat, the Narendra Modi administration and the BJP were criticised for "misusing" the public broadcaster. According to DD director-general Archana Datta, the "speech was like any other news event; therefore, we covered it."

Since private television channels were authorised in 1991, Doordarshan has experienced a steep decline in viewership. Although it earns significant advertising revenue—due to its compulsory feed—from the highest bidder for national events (including cricket matches), there has been a proposal to fund it by imposing a licence fee to own a television in India.

Legacy
A film named after the broadcaster, spiritually motivated by the 2003 German film Good Bye, Lenin!, was released in February 2020.

See also 
 All India Radio
 Sansad TV
 DD Free Dish
 Ministry of Information and Broadcasting (India)
 DD Retro
 List of programs broadcast by DD National

References

External links 

 Durdarshan official site
 Doordarshan news site
 DD News on Twitter
 DD News on Facebook

 

Television networks in India
Television stations in India
Companies based in New Delhi
Mass media companies established in 1959
Television channels and stations established in 1959
1959 establishments in Delhi
Foreign television channels broadcasting in the United Kingdom
Multilingual broadcasters
Producers who won the Best Debut Feature Film of a Director National Film Award
Producers who won the Best Film on Environment Conservation/Preservation National Film Award
Producers who won the Best Film on Family Welfare National Film Award
Producers who won the Best Film on National Integration National Film Award
Producers who won the Best Film on Other Social Issues National Film Award
Television broadcasting companies of India
Mass media companies of India
Broadcasting